Manoj Chauhan (born 10 October 1992) is an Indian former cricketer. He played six first-class matches for Delhi between 2010 and 2014.

See also
 List of Delhi cricketers

References

External links
 

1992 births
Living people
Indian cricketers
Delhi cricketers
Cricketers from Delhi